M. excelsa may refer to:
 Metrosideros excelsa, the pohutukawa, a coastal evergreen tree species
 Milicia excelsa, a tree species from tropical Africa
 Myrmica excelsa Kupyanskaya, an ant species in the genus Myrmica

See also
 Excelsa (disambiguation)